Blood is a collaborative album by American singer-songwriter Stan Ridgway and electronic musician Pietra Wexstun. It was released on September 23, 2003 by Sympathy for the Record Industry and A440 Records.

Track listing

Personnel
Adapted from the Blood liner notes.

Musicians
Alvin Fike – brass
Stan Ridgway – guitar, harmonica, Prophet-5 synthesizer, Chamberlin keyboard, sampler, production
Laslo Vickers – cello, contrabass, violin
Pietra Wexstun – piano, organ, mellotron, Juno 106 synthesizer, autoharp, sampler, voice, production

Production and additional personnel
Bob Demaa – mastering
Brian Jackson – design, art direction
Sean P. Riley – executive production
Mark Ryden – design, art direction

Release history

References

External links 
 

2003 albums
Collaborative albums
Stan Ridgway albums
Albums produced by Stan Ridgway
Sympathy for the Record Industry albums